Poroma Rural LLG is a local-level government (LLG) of Southern Highlands Province, Papua New Guinea.

Wards
01. Kongu
02. Tindom 2
03. Mondisarep
04. Kar
05. Utupia
06. Undu Kopa
07. Farata
08. Kusa
09. Det
10. Onja-Rundu
11. Waramesa
12. ombadi
13. Kapit/Kum 11
14. Purtre/Kum 12
15. Wanga
16. Mato
17. Nenja
18. Poroma Station
19. Kupipi
20. Poroma
21. Toiwaro
22. Tamenda
23. Kunjulu
26. Kar 11

References

Local-level governments of Southern Highlands Province